Maria Christina Maldonado Smith (born January 8, 1982) is an American beauty pageant titleholder from Lexington, Kentucky. She was named Miss Kentucky Teen 1999 and crowned Miss Kentucky 2004. She competed for the Miss America 2005 title.

Pageant career

Miss Kentucky Teen 1999
In 1999, Maldonado won the title of Miss Lexington Teen. At the state pageant, she was selected as Miss Kentucky Teen. At the time, there was no national pageant beyond this state title as the first Miss America's Outstanding Teen pageant was held in August 2005.

Vying for Miss Kentucky
In 2001, Maldonado won the Miss Campbellsville Area title. She competed as one of 31 qualifiers in the 2001 Miss Kentucky pageant with the platform "Increasing Public Awareness of Tourette Syndrome" and a vocal performance in the talent portion of the competition. She was named was third runner-up to winner Monica Hardin.

In October 2001, Maldonado won the Miss Jeffersontown 2002 title and became one of 32 qualifiers for the 2002 Miss Kentucky pageant. She competed with the platform "Renewing Our Commitment to Special Education" and a vocal performance in the talent portion of the competition. She was named was second runner-up to winner Mary Catherine Correll.

In November 2002, Maldonado won the Miss Metropolitan 2003 title. She was one of 32 qualifiers for the 2003 Miss Kentucky pageant. She competed on a platform of "Renewing Our Commitment to Special Education" and a vocal performance in the talent portion of the competition. She was named was third runner-up to winner MacKenzie Mayes.

Miss Kentucky 2004
Maldonado was crowned Miss Heart of the South 2004 which made her eligible to compete at the 2004 Miss Kentucky pageant. She entered the state pageant in June 2004 as one of 31 qualifiers. Maldonado's competition talent was a vocal performance and her platform was "All Kinds of Minds".

Maldonado won the competition on Saturday, June 10, 2004, when she received her crown from outgoing Miss Kentucky titleholder MacKenzie Mayes. She earned more than $10,000 in scholarship money from the state pageant, plus use of an apartment and a Ford Explorer during her reign. As Miss Kentucky, her activities included public appearances across the state of Kentucky.

Maldonado was Kentucky's representative at the Miss America 2005 pageant in Atlantic City, New Jersey, in September 2004. She was not a finalist for the national title but won the Non-Finalist Interview Award and a combined $8,000 in scholarship prizes during the pageant.

Early life and education
Maldonado is a native of Lexington, Kentucky, and a 2000 graduate of Lafayette High School. She is a 2004 graduate of the University of Kentucky. She married her husband, Dan Smith, in 2005.

References

External links

Miss Kentucky official website

Living people
1982 births
American beauty pageant winners
Miss America 2005 delegates
People from Lexington, Kentucky
University of Kentucky alumni
Miss Kentucky winners